Thomas McGreevy (July 29, 1825 – January 2, 1897) was a Canadian politician and contractor.

Born in Quebec, he was the son of Robert McGreevy, a blacksmith, and Rose Smith. In 1867 he was elected Member of Parliament (MP) for Quebec West (as a liberal conservative), and was re-elected in 1872, 1874, 1878, 1882, 1887 and 1891.

He was expelled from the House of Commons for corruption on September 29, 1891, and following his conviction for defrauding the government was sentenced to a year in prison. (The other MPs to be expelled from the Canadian House of Commons are Louis Riel [twice] and Quebec communist Fred Rose.) Following his release on March 1, 1894, he was re-elected to Parliament in 1895.

He was the contractor for the building of the Parliament of Canada.

He was married three times: to Mary Ann Rourke on July 13, 1857, to Bridget Caroline Nolan on February 4, 1861 and to Mary Georgina Woolsey on January 30, 1867. He had several children by Mary Georgina including Stella and Herbert. Mary Georgina Woolsey came from a wealthy Quebec family, now most famous for being the subject of William Berczy's portrait of The Woolsey Family (1809).

Electoral record

References 
 
 
 

1825 births
1897 deaths
Politicians from Quebec City
Conservative Party of Canada (1867–1942) MPs
Canadian people of Irish descent
Members of the House of Commons of Canada from Quebec
Conservative Party of Quebec MLCs
Anglophone Quebec people
Corruption in Canada
Canadian politicians convicted of crimes